Dénes Andor Varga (born 29 March 1987) is a Hungarian water polo player, currently playing for Ferencváros.

He was a member of the gold medal winning Hungary men's national water polo team at the 2008 Beijing Olympics, together with his older brother Dániel.

Honours

National
 Olympic Games:  gold medal – 2008;  bronze medal – 2020
 World Championships:  gold medal – 2013;  silver medal – 2007, 2017
 European Championship:  gold medal – 2020;  silver medal – 2006, 2014;  bronze medal – 2008, 2012, 2016
 FINA World League:  silver medal – 2007, 2013, 2014
 FINA World Cup:  silver medal – 2014
 Junior World Championships: (gold medal - 2007; Silver medal - 2003)
 Junior European Championship: (silver medal - 2002, 2006; Bronze medal - 2004)
 Youth European Championship: (silver medal - 2003)

Club
Vasas (TEVA-VasasPlaket)
 Hungarian Championship: 2006–07, 2007–08, 2008–09, 2009–10
 Hungarian Cup: 2004, 2005, 2009
 Hungarian Super Cup: 2006

Primorje Rijeka (Primorje Erste banka)
  Croatian Championship: 2013–14
  Croatian Cup: 2012, 2013
 Adriatic League: 2012–13, 2013–14
 LEN Champions League runners-up: 2011–12

Szolnok (Szolnoki Dózsa-KÖZGÉP) 
 Hungarian Championship: 2014–15, 2015–16, 2016–17
 Hungarian Cup: 2014, 2016
 Hungarian Super Cup: 2016
 LEN Champions League: 2016–17

Ferencváros (FTC PQS Waterpolo, FTC-Telekom) 
 Hungarian Championship: 2017–18, 2018–19, 2021–22
 Hungarian Cup: 2018, 2019, 2020, 2021
 Hungarian Super Cup: 2018
 LEN Champions League: 2018–19 ; runners-up: 2020–21
 LEN Euro Cup: 2017–18
 LEN Super Cup: 2018, 2019

Awards
 Szalay Iván-díj (2004)
 Faragó Tamás-díj (Best junior player of year): (2007, 2008)
 Junior World Championship Top Scorer: 2007
 Junior World Championship MVP: 2007
 2007 Junior World Championship Team of the Tournament : 2007
 Junior Príma díj (2008)
 Member of the Hungarian team of year: 2008, 2013
 Adriatic League MVP (1):  2010–11 with Primorje Rijeka
 Adriatic League Top Scorer (2): 2010–11, 2013–14  with Primorje Rijeka
 Ministerial Certificate of Merit (2012)
 LEN Champions League Top Scorer  (1): 2015–16 with Szolnok
2013 World Championship Team of the Tournament
 World Championship MVP (1): 2013 Barcelona
 LEN "European Player of the Year" award: 2013
 FINA  "World Player of the Year" award: 2013
 Total-waterpolo magazine's man water polo "World Player of the Year" award: 2019
Member of the World Team 2019 by total-waterpolo
Member of the World Team of the Year's  2000-2020 by total-waterpolo
World Cup  MVP (1): 2014 Almaty
 European Championship MVP (2): 2014 Budapest, 2020 Budapest
 Hungarian Water Polo Player of the Year: 2014, 2018, 2019 
 Hungarian Championship  MVP (1): 2014–15 with Szolnok
 Hungarian Championship Top Scorer (1): 2016–17 with Ferencvaros
LEN Champions League Final Four MVP (1): 2012 with Primorje Rijeka  
LEN Champions League Final Eight MVP (1): 2019 with Ferencvaros 

Orders
   Officer's Cross of the Order of Merit of the Republic of Hungary (2008)

See also
 Hungary men's Olympic water polo team records and statistics
 List of Olympic champions in men's water polo
 List of Olympic medalists in water polo (men)
 List of men's Olympic water polo tournament top goalscorers
 List of world champions in men's water polo
 List of World Aquatics Championships medalists in water polo

References

External links

 

1987 births
Living people
Water polo players from Budapest
Hungarian male water polo players
Water polo drivers
Water polo players at the 2008 Summer Olympics
Water polo players at the 2012 Summer Olympics
Water polo players at the 2016 Summer Olympics
Medalists at the 2008 Summer Olympics
Olympic gold medalists for Hungary in water polo
World Aquatics Championships medalists in water polo
Water polo players at the 2020 Summer Olympics
Medalists at the 2020 Summer Olympics
Olympic bronze medalists for Hungary in water polo
21st-century Hungarian people